Frank Fernández (born April 16, 1943) is an American former professional baseball catcher.

Biography
Fernández signed as an amateur free agent with the New York Yankees of Major League Baseball (MLB) upon graduation from Curtis High School in Staten Island in 1961. He spent six seasons in their minor league system before debuting with the Yankees as a September call-up in 1967. He went one for three in his major league debut against the California Angels in the second game of a doubleheader on September 12.

Fernández backed up Jake Gibbs for 1968 and 1969. Upon former first round draft pick Thurman Munson's arrival in the major leagues, the Yankees dealt Fernández to the Oakland Athletics with Al Downing for Danny Cater and Ossie Chavarria prior to the start of the 1970 season.

During the 1971 season, the A's traded Fernández to the Washington Senators with Paul Lindblad and Don Mincher for Mike Epstein and Darold Knowles. A little over a month later, he was purchased back by the A's, only to be dealt away again during the 1971 season—this time to the Chicago Cubs for Adrian Garrett.

Fernández made three pinch hitting appearances with the Cubs in 1972, but spent most of his time with their triple A affiliate, the Wichita Aeros before being reacquired by the Yankees in a minor league deal. He also spent time in Oakland's and the Detroit Tigers' farm system before retiring.

Fernández holds the record for the most home runs (39) for a player with a batting average less than .200, as well as having the most career walks than hits by a non-pitcher with over 100 at-bats, with 164 walks and 145 hits.

Fernández was inducted into the Staten Island Sports Hall of Fame in 2000.

References

External links

1943 births
Living people
Águilas del Zulia players
Chicago Cubs players
Columbus Confederate Yankees players
Curtis High School alumni
Florida Instructional League Yankees players
Fort Lauderdale Yankees players
Greensboro Yankees players
Idaho Falls Yankees players
Iowa Oaks players
Major League Baseball catchers
New York Yankees players
Oakland Athletics players
Sportspeople from Staten Island
Baseball players from New York City
Syracuse Chiefs players
Tiburones de La Guaira players
American expatriate baseball players in Venezuela
Tigres de Aragua players
Toledo Mud Hens players
Tucson Toros players
Washington Senators (1961–1971) players
Wichita Aeros players